Gramella marina is a Gram-negative, aerobic and heterotrophic bacterium from the genus of Gramella which has been isolated from the sea urchin Strongylocentrotus intermedius.

References

Flavobacteria
Bacteria described in 2010